Jasione mansanetiana is a species of plant in the family Campanulaceae. It is endemic to Spain.  Its natural habitat is rocky areas. It is threatened by habitat loss.

References

mansanetiana
Endemic flora of Spain
Endangered plants
Taxonomy articles created by Polbot